1872 East Sydney colonial by-election may refer to 

 1872 East Sydney colonial by-election 1 held in May 1872
 1872 East Sydney colonial by-election 2 held in June 1872

See also
 List of New South Wales state by-elections